16 Songs may refer to:

Fryderyk Chopin: 16 Songs Op. 74
Kodály: 16 Songs Op.1